Parliamentary elections were held in France on 28 February 1857, with a second round on 5 March. According to the constitution of the empire, partisans of the regime ran as "official candidates" of the regime in often gerrymandered circonscriptions. As official candidates, their campaign expenditures were paid by the government and their campaigns led by the local government.

Results

References

Legislative elections in France
France
Legislative
France